Mone Par Tal Maung Ko is a 1973 Burmese black-and-white drama film, directed by Tin Htun Naing starring Win Oo, Myint Myint Khin, Phoe Par Gyi and Aung Lwin. Myint Myint Khin won the Best Actress Award in 1973 Myanmar Motion Picture Academy Awards for this film.

Cast
Win Oo as Win Oo
Myint Myint Khin as Myint Myint May
Phoe Par Gyi as U Kan Gyi
Aung Lwin as Aung Lwin

References

1973 films
1970s Burmese-language films
Films shot in Myanmar
Burmese black-and-white films
1973 drama films
Burmese drama films